The 1290s BC is a decade which lasted from 1299 BC to 1290 BC.

Events and trends
 c. 1295 BC–1186 BC–Great Temple of Amun, Karnak, is built. New Kingdom. 
 1292 BC—End of the Eighteenth dynasty of Egypt, start of the Nineteenth Dynasty.
 1292 BC—The coronation of Ramesses I.
 Egyptian-Hittite Wars, c.1294 B.C.

Significant people
Ramesses I – Pharaoh of the Nineteenth Dynasty of Egypt
 Shalmaneser I, king of Assyria, born (approximate date).
 Ramesses the Great, pharaoh of Egypt, born (approximate date).

References